Binod Pradhan is an Indian cinematographer, director and actor. He has worked in several popular and acclaimed films as a cinematographer. Some of his award-winning films include 1942 A Love Story, Devdas, Rang De Basanti, Mission Kashmir, and Munna Bhai M.B.B.S.

Biography
Binod grew up in the picturesque hill town of Kalimpong, West Bengal. Coming from a humble Gorkha Newar background, Binod got his first box camera in the early years from his father, H. K. Pradhan, who ran a photo studio. The love affair with camera started from thereon. Binod would shoot black-and-white pictures and try and colour them using water-paints. He was often caught shooting unknown portraits and making prints of them. Displeased at first, his father recognized his work and most of Binod's images landed up on the display case of the studio and he was rewarded with an Asahi Pentax. Binod and his camera were pretty much inseparable and by the age of 14, he was running things at the studio.

Soon found the isolated life at Kalimpong was a hindrance for taking up photography as a career option. There was no formal forum to learn new techniques and share his experience. On hearing about FTII in Pune, he approached the institute with his portfolio and was admitted into a three-year course in cinematography.

The break into films came when film director Prem Sagar came to the institute to judge the students' work. Impressed with Binod's work, Prem Sagar immediately offered him the job of an assistant at Sagar Arts. He went on to assist Prem Sagar on the Dharam-Hema Malini starrers, Charas and Ram Bharose. Realizing that he was not making his identity in the huge industry, he started looking at other options. Ace cameraman A. K. Bir, who was working on a film Gharonda offered him the job of assistant cameraman, in charge of the zoom and focus department. This proved to be a very useful internship.

Work soon dried up and he often found himself changing addresses very often. Few sporadic assignments like documentaries (for Durga Khote productions), ads and corporate films helped improve his technical skills.

During this period, he lived with a Kutchi family and this was when he met Dolly. He fell in love with Dolly, and was unable to convince her parents. Resorting to desperate measures, he eloped with her back to Kalimpong. They soon had their first-born, Binay. Out-of-work Binod devoted himself completely to raising him. He also has a second son named Deep Pradhan.

Slowly, old friends approached him with work assignments. He worked with Mani Kaul on the celluloid version of Ghashiram Kotwal and did Jabbar Patel's Jait Re Jait. The Assamese film Apa Roopa happened then.

The dry spell finally broke when Kundan Shah started gathering all his mates from FTII for the film Jaane Bhi Do Yaaro. This film went on to reach cult status.

Filmography

As cinematographer

As director

As associate director

As actor

Awards and nominations
List of documented awards for Best Cinematography

International Indian Film Academy Awards
 2003 Won for the film Devdas
 2001 Won for the film Mission Kashmir

Filmfare Awards
 2013 Won for Bhaag Milkha Bhaag
 2007 Won for Rang De Basanti
 2003 Won for Devdas
 2001 Nominated for Mission Kashmir

Screen Weekly Awards
 2007 Won for the film Rang De Basanti
 2004 Nominated for the film Munna Bhai M.B.B.S.
 2003 Won for the film Devdas
 2001 Won for the film Mission Kashmir
 1998 Won for the film Kareeb
 1994 Won for the film 1942: A Love Story

Zee Cine Awards
 2007 Won for the film Rang De Basanti
 2004 Won for the film Munna Bhai M.B.B.S.
 2003 Won for the film Devdas

Global Cinema Festival Sikkim
 2020 Lifetime Achievement Award

References

External links
 
 Binod Pradhan-Director of Photography
 Cinematographer Binod Pradhan finds his muse in 'Devdas'

Hindi film cinematographers
People from Kalimpong district
Living people
Filmfare Awards winners
Film and Television Institute of India alumni
Cinematographers from West Bengal
Year of birth missing (living people)
Indian Gorkhas